Wilki (meaning "wolves") is a rock band from Warsaw.

Wilki may also refer to the following villages:
Wilki, Pomeranian Voivodeship (north Poland)
Wilki, Warmian-Masurian Voivodeship  (north-east Poland)